Dongsa Gangmok (Compendium of the eastern history) is a Korean history book written by Ahn Jeong-bok (1712-1791) about the Joseon dynasty. It is composed of 20 volumes, and describes from Gojoseon to Goryeo.

The book consists of 17 volumes for the East and 3 volumes for the East. The narrative style is a one-year-old style and is a representative history book of the time of study.

History 
In 1756, the author began compiling at the age of 45 and completed the first draft in three years. Afterwards, he exchanged opinions with his teachers and friends in a letter and revised the draft. He completed it in 1778, 22 years after he began compiling.

Content Configuration 
The contents of the text were described in 'Gang-Mok' form, with important events marked in a 'Gang', and articles related to them were written down in a 'Mok'. Where his opinions should be put, he wrote two lines of  'An(meaning "look")' and two lines of comments.

Opening 
It contains a legend of the description and a map of the map of Dangun, a map of three last names of Shilla, Goguryeo map, Baekje map, and a map of Goryeo.

References

History books about Korea
Joseon dynasty works